Mutz may refer to:

Nickname
 Mutz Ens (1884–1950), American baseball player
 Mutz Greenbaum (1896–1968), German-born cinematographer
 Moshe Matalon (politician) (born 1953), Israeli politician

Surname
 Bill Mutz, mayor of Lakeland, Florida (2018–2021)
 Diana Mutz (born 1962), American political scientist
 John Mutz (born 1935), American politician

Other
 BLS RABe 515, a Swiss train class

Lists of people by nickname